Melih Kibar (6 September 1951 – 7 April 2005) was a Turkish composer.

Biography
Born in Istanbul, he graduated from the German High School Istanbul and studied chemical engineering at Boğaziçi University. He received a Master's degree from the University College of Wales, Aberystwyth.

At the age of eight, Kibar enrolled at the Conservatory of Istanbul Municipality. He started his musical career in the school years and won a first prize as composer at the Milliyet High School Music Contest in 1970. Until 1975 he worked with Timur Selçuk. One of his earliest compositions was Çoban Yıldızı, a jingle for Eurovision Song Contest national selection.  Since 1975, he composed 273 tunes, 9 musicals and 32 film musicals in cooperation with various artists, in particular with lyricist Çiğdem Talu. In 1976, he received the Golden Orange prize for the soundtrack of the film "Hababam Sınıfı". Melih Kibar participated in various international festivals and was winner of many prizes in Turkey and abroad. At the Eurovision Song Contest 1986 held in Bergen, Norway, his song "Halley" and at the Eurovision Song Contest 1995 held in Dublin, Ireland, his another song "Sev!" represented Turkey. 

Melih Kibar died of skin cancer on 7 April 2005 at a hospital in Istanbul. He was taken there two days before his death. He was laid to rest at Nakkaştepe Cemetery following the religious funeral held at Bebek Mosque. He is survived by his wife Ethel and his daughter Merve.

Discography
Yadigar, 2001
Saat Sabahın Dokuzu, 2003
Hababam Sınıfı-Merhaba, 2004

References

1951 births
2005 deaths
Musicians from Istanbul
Turkish composers
Alumni of Aberystwyth University
Best Music Score Golden Orange Award winners
Deutsche Schule Istanbul alumni
Boğaziçi University alumni
Deaths from skin cancer
Deaths from cancer in Turkey

Eurovision Song Contest conductors